Srednje Jarše is a settlement on the right bank of the Kamnik Bistrica River just north of Domžale, in the Upper Carniola region of Slovenia.

References

External links
Srednje Jarše on Geopedia

Populated places in the Municipality of Domžale